"Sunday Girl" is a song recorded by the British synthpop duo Erasure. Written by Erasure members Vince Clarke and Andy Bell, it is the opening track on the duo's thirteenth studio album Light at the End of the World. The song was the second UK single released from the album, on 11 June 2007.  A North American release followed in July 2007.

"Sunday Girl" is a very uptempo electronic music song which tells the story of someone who has immersed herself in nightlife and while in a nightclub catches the attention of Bell, who offers to dance with her "'til Sunday morning" but warns "don't you mess your life up, Sunday Girl". The introduction is very similar to the bridge of the duo's 1995 single "Fingers & Thumbs (Cold Summer's Day)".

An unofficial music video of the song was featured on Erasure's official website, consisting of backstage scenes and live performances from their Light at the End of the World world tour.

The single became Erasure's thirty-fourth Top 40 single in the UK, but has the distinction of being their lowest charting (and the first to miss the Top 30) since "Oh L'amour", twenty-one years earlier.

Track listing

UK CD single (CDMUTE376)
"Sunday Girl" (Radio Mix)
"Take Me on a Highway"

UK Maxi-CD single (LCDMUTE376)
"Sunday Girl" (Extended 12" Mix)
"Sunday Girl" (Riffs & Rays Club Edit)
"Sunday Girl" (Riffs & Rays Dub Edit)

UK 7" vinyl picture disc (MUTE376)
"Sunday Girl" (Radio Mix)
"Take Me on a Highway"

North American maxi-CD single
"Sunday Girl" (Radio Mix)
"Take Me on a Highway"
"Sunday Girl" (Extended 12" Mix)
"Sunday Girl" (Riffs & Rays Club Edit)
"Sunday Girl" (Riffs & Rays Dub Edit)

Chart performance

References

2007 singles
Erasure songs
Songs written by Vince Clarke
Songs written by Andy Bell (singer)
Song recordings produced by Gareth Jones
Mute Records singles
2007 songs